Ittefaq may refer to:

 The Daily Ittefaq, a Bangladeshi national newspaper in Bengali
 Ittefaq (1969 film), Indian film
 Ittefaq (2017 film), Indian film, remake of the 1969 film
 Ittefaq (2001 film), a Hindi action drama film 
 Ittefaq Group, a business group in Pakistan owned by Nawaz Sharif's family